CLAD may refer to:

 Centre de linguistique appliquée de Dakar, the language institute in Dakar, Senegal
 Certified LabVIEW Associate Developer
 Crosscultural, Language, and Academic Development, a certification program for Teaching English as a second language

See also
Cladding (disambiguation)